The Triumphs and Travails of Orphan Mae is the second studio album by Laura Veirs, self-released in 2001. It was subsequently re-released under the Bella Union label on February 21, 2005.

Track listing
"Jailhouse Fire" – 2:32
"Up the River" – 3:22
"John Henry Lives" – 4:07
"Black-Eyed Susan" – 3:41
"Orphan Mae" – 2:01
"Blue Ink" – 4:41
"Montague Road" – 3:57
"Through December" – 4:15
"Raven Marching Band" – 5:16
"Movin' Along" – 4:56

References

2001 albums
Laura Veirs albums
Albums produced by Tucker Martine
Bella Union albums